Moehringia villosa, commonly known as the short-haired sandwort, is a flowering plant of the genus Moehringia. It grows in cracks in sunny, rocky and dry areas.

References

External links

Flora of Slovenia
villosa